Yurga is a town in Kemerovo Oblast, Russia, located on the Tom River and the Trans-Siberian Railway. Population:

History
It was founded in 1886. Work settlement status was granted to it in 1942; town status was granted in 1949.

Administrative and municipal status
Within the framework of administrative divisions, Yurga serves as the administrative center of Yurginsky District, even though it is not a part of it. As an administrative division, it is incorporated separately as Yurga Town Under Oblast Jurisdiction—an administrative unit with the status equal to that of the districts. As a municipal division, Yurga Town Under Oblast Jurisdiction is incorporated as Yurginsky Urban Okrug.

Military
The 74th Motor Rifle Brigade of the Russian Ground Forces is based here.

References

Notes

Sources

Cities and towns in Kemerovo Oblast
Monotowns in Russia